Pat Kelly is a Gaelic footballer, formerly for the Mayo county team, and currently for St Vincents. He won a Dublin Senior Football Championship title with St Vincents in 2007. Kelly then went on to win the Leinster Senior Club Football Championship final against Tyrrellspass of Westmeath. Kelly won the 2008 All-Ireland Senior Club Football Championship with St Vincents in a hard-fought game.

References

1981 births
Living people
Gaelic football backs
Mayo inter-county Gaelic footballers
St Vincents (Dublin) Gaelic footballers